The Selenidioididae are a family of parasitic alveolates in the phylum Apicomplexa. Species in this order infect marine invertebrates.

Taxonomy

The order Archigregarinorida was redefined by Levine in 1971 and divided into two families: Exoschizonidae and Selenidioididae.

There are seven genera and 74 species recognised in this family.

Description

Species in this family undergo asexual schizogony.

Life cycle

The species in the family infect the gastrointestinal tract and are presumably transmitted by the orofaecal route but the details of this mechanism are presently unknown.

References

Apicomplexa families